This is a list of notable persons and groups who formally endorsed or voiced support for Senator Barack Obama's presidential campaign during the Democratic Party primaries and the general election.

U.S. presidents and vice presidents

U.S. senators

Current

Former

U.S. representatives

Current

Former

Governors

Current

Former

Presidential staff and advisors

Military

National political figures

Mayors

State, local and territory officials

Publications

Newspapers

Magazines
 Condé Nast Portfolio
 Esquire
 The New Yorker – New York City, New York
 VIBE

Academics

Economists

Scientists 

 Sally Ride, physicist, former NASA astronaut, first American woman in space

Other academics

Business people

Fashion designers

Labor unions

Labor leaders and union officials

Social and political activists

Organizations

Environmental organizations, humane organizations, and wildlife groups

Other organizations

Native American tribes 
 Crow Nation
 Fort Peck Indian Reservation
 Navajo Nation

Entertainers and artists

Actors and actresses

Comedians

Directors

Models
 Adrianne Curry
 Heidi Klum
 Cindy Crawford

Musicians

Television and radio personalities

Writers

Foreign writers

Athletes and sports

NBA basketball players

NFL football

Major League Baseball (MLB)

Wrestlers and boxers

Others

Notable family members of political figures

Other notable individuals 

 David Weigel,

Foreign political figures

See also

References 

Barack Obama 2008 presidential campaign
Obama, Barack
2008-related lists
2008 United States presidential election endorsements
Barack Obama-related lists